Johnathan James Aitken (born May 24, 1978) is a Canadian former professional ice hockey defenceman who played in the National Hockey League (NHL) with the Boston Bruins and the Chicago Blackhawks.

Playing career
Aitken was drafted 8th overall in the 1996 NHL Entry Draft by the Boston Bruins. He played in three games over the course of his two-year entry-level contract. For the 2000–01 season he went to the Czech Republic to play for HC Sparta Praha of the Czech Extraliga. He returned to North America after only a year, and made it back to the NHL during the 2003–04 season with the Chicago Blackhawks, playing 41 games, scoring just one assist.  He moved to the Austrian Hockey League for Klagenfurt AC for the 2006–07 season before retiring from professional hockey.

Career statistics

Awards and honours

References
2005 NHL Official Guide & Record Book

External links
 

1978 births
Boston Bruins draft picks
Boston Bruins players
Brandon Wheat Kings players
Canadian expatriate ice hockey players in Austria
Canadian expatriate ice hockey players in the Czech Republic
Canadian ice hockey defencemen
Chicago Blackhawks players
EC KAC players
Hamilton Bulldogs (AHL) players
HC Sparta Praha players
Jackson Bandits players
Living people
Manitoba Moose players
Medicine Hat Tigers players
National Hockey League first-round draft picks
Norfolk Admirals players
Providence Bruins players
Ice hockey people from Edmonton
Canadian expatriate ice hockey players in the United States